Tanaorhinus kina is a species of moth of the family Geometridae first described by Charles Swinhoe in 1893. It is found in Asia, including India, Bhutan and Taiwan.

The wingspan is 47–60 mm.

Subspecies
Tanaorhinus kina kina (India)
Tanaorhinus kina embrithes Prout, 1934 (Sikkim)
Tanaorhinus kina flavinfra Inoue, 1978 (Taiwan)

References

Moths described in 1893
Geometrinae